Triplophysa xiangxiensis is a species of stone loach endemic to Yuan River in Hunan, China. It is a cave-dwelling species. It grows to  SL.

References

X
Cave fish
Endemic fauna of China
Freshwater fish of China
Fish described in 1986
Taxonomy articles created by Polbot